The Order of the Companions of O. R. Tambo is a South African honour. It was instituted on 6 December 2002, and is granted by the President of South Africa to foreign citizens who have promoted South African interests and aspirations through co-operation, solidarity, and support.

The order is named after the late Oliver Tambo, who was the African National Congress's president-in-exile for many years.

Current classes
The three classes of appointment to the Order are, in descending order of precedence:

 Supreme Companion of OR Tambo in gold, for heads of state and, in special cases, heads of government (SCOT)
 Grand Companion of OR Tambo in silver, for heads of government, ministers of state, supreme court judges, presidents of legislatures, secretaries of state, ambassadors, commanders-in-chief (GCOT) 
 Companion of OR Tambo in bronze, for legislators, envoys, senior military officers (COT)

Symbolism
The badge of the order is oval, and depicts a symbol similar to that of the Taijitu between two arrowheads, framed by two mole snakes. The symbol represents the meeting of diverse spiritual energies, and the snakes represent solidarity and support.  The South African coat of arms is displayed on the reverse.

The ribbon is white, with recurring grey symbols down the centre.  All three classes are worn around the neck.

Recipients are also presented with a carved wooden walking stick, which has a serpent wound around the shaft and a spoon-shaped head displaying the badge of the order and the national arms.  The walking stick symbolises support and solidarity, and a commitment to stand by the recipient in return.

Recipients

Refusals
On 28 January 2008, New Zealand anti-apartheid activist John Minto created a controversy over his letter to former South African President Thabo Mbeki after being nominated for the award, saying that he would refuse, on principle, to accept any award from the ANC.

See also
 South African civil honours

References

 
Awards established in 2002
2002 establishments in South Africa